German Township is one of the nine townships of Montgomery County, Ohio, United States.  As of the 2010 census the population was 8,429.

Geography
Located in the southwestern corner of the county, it borders the following townships:
Jackson Township - north
Jefferson Township - northeast
Miami Township - east
Franklin Township, Warren County - southeast
Madison Township, Butler County - south
Gratis Township, Preble County - west
Lanier Township, Preble County - northwest corner

It is the only township in the county with a border on Butler County.

Two municipalities are located in German Township: the village of Germantown is located in the northeast, and a small part of the city of Carlisle, in the southeast.

Name and history
It is one of five German Townships statewide.

German Township was described in 1833 as having seven gristmills, nine saw mills, two fulling mills, five tanneries, and sixteen distilleries.

Government
The township is governed by a three-member board of trustees, who are elected in November of odd-numbered years to a four-year term beginning on the following January 1. Two are elected in the year after the presidential election and one is elected in the year before it. There is also an elected township fiscal officer, who serves a four-year term beginning on April 1 of the year after the election, which is held in November of the year before the presidential election. Vacancies in the fiscal officership or on the board of trustees are filled by the remaining trustees.

References

External links
County website

Townships in Montgomery County, Ohio
Townships in Ohio